Klausenburg, also known as Sanz-Klausenburg, is a Hasidic dynasty that originated in the Transylvanian city of Cluj-Napoca, today in Romania.

At the behest of Rabbi Yekusiel Yehudah Halberstam, Klausenburger Rebbe from 1927–1994, the movement was split into two separate movements after his death, headed by his two sons. The Sanz-Klausenburger Hasidim are located in Borough Park, New York City, while the Sanzer Hasidim are based in Kiryat Sanz, Netanya, Israel. There are also followings in Los Angeles, California; Jerusalem; Stamford Hill, London; Antwerp; and Union City, New Jersey, and in the USA, in Borough Park, Williamsburg, Monsey, and Lakewood.

Sanz-Klausenburg rabbinical lineage

The Klausenburger Rebbes are descended from Rabbi Chaim Halberstam of Sanz, who was a disciple of Rabbi Naftoli Tzvi of Ropshitz. Rabbi Naftoli was a disciple of Rebbe Elimelech of Lizhensk author of Noam Elimelech. Rebbe Elimelech was a disciple of Rebbe Dovber, the Maggid (Preacher) of Mezritch, the primary disciple of the Baal Shem Tov, the founder of Hasidism.

History

The Klausenburger dynasty was founded by Rabbi Yekusiel Yehudah Halberstam in 1927, when he assumed the position of Rav of Klausenburg, the capital city of Transylvania in western Romania. Halberstam was the great-grandson of Rabbi Chaim of Sanz, founder of the Sanz Hasidic dynasty.

Rabbi Yekusiel Yehudah Halberstam grew up in Rudnik, Poland, and was known as a child prodigy and an excellent scholar. In the town of Klausenburg, which he led until the outbreak of World War II, he attracted many followers, and a great number of Sanz Hasidim began to follow the young Rebbe.

As a result of the Holocaust, almost the entire community was destroyed. Approximately 15% survived the Holocaust, including the Rebbe, who lost his wife and eleven children. He emerged as a leader in the displaced persons camps in Europe as he created a communal survivors organization called She'aris Hapleitah ("the surviving remnant"), which operated religious schools for boys and girls and yeshivas for young men in 19 different DP camps, as well as a host of religious services.

In 1947, he emigrated to America and established his court in the Williamsburg section of Brooklyn, where he began a widescale movement to increase Jewish observance. He founded many Jewish day schools and institutions of higher learning. He launched revolutionary programs for comprehensive study of the Talmud. He created a program called Mifal HaShas, in which students would master thirty folios of the Talmud in one month. His influence permeated areas as far as Canada, Mexico, and Israel.

In 1957, he established the Kiryat Sanz neighborhood in the beachside city of Netanya, Israel. Over the next few years, he raised money for the establishment of girls' and boys' schools and yeshivas, an orphanage, an old-age home, and a hospital to serve this community. He moved to Kiryat Sanz in 1960. In 1968, he founded yet another Sanz community in Union City, New Jersey, and afterwards divided his time between that community and his residence in Netanya.

Halberstam died on June 18, 1994, and was buried in Netanya. In his will, he divided leadership of the Klausenburger Hasidim between his two sons (both born in his second marriage after World War II). His elder son, Zvi Elimelech Halberstam, became the Sanz-Klausenburger Rebbe (also called Sanzer Rebbe) of Netanya, and Shmuel Dovid Halberstam became the Sanz-Klausenburger Rebbe of Brooklyn.

Sanz-Klausenburg today

 Grand Rabbi Tzvi Elimelech Halberstam is the Sanz-Klausenburger Rebbe in (Kiryat Sanz, Netanya,) Israel
 Rabbi Yechezkel Shraga Boruch Halberstam, son of Rabbi Zvi Elimelech, is Rav haTso'ir
 Grand Rabbi Shmuel Dovid Halberstam, is the Sanz-Klausenburger Rebbe in Borough Park,

The Rebbe's sons-in-law are:
 The Late Grand Rabbi Shlomo Goldman, the Zhviller Rebbe, of Union City, NJ
 Rabbi Berel Weiss, Rav of Kiryat Sanz, Jerusalem
 Rabbi Fishel Mutzen, Rav of Kiryat Baal Shem Tov in Petah Tikva
 Rabbi Shaul Yehuda Prizant, Rav of the Sanz-Klausenburg community in Union City, New Jersey; and rosh mesivta Yeshivat Shaar Efraim Monsey
 Rabbi Eliezer Duvid Shapiro, Rav of the Sanz community in Bnei Brak

In contrast to the custom among many Rebbes, the Klausenburger Rebbe did not take sons-in-law exclusively from rabbinic families; rather, he chose the best students of his yeshiva to marry his daughters. The only exception was Rabbi Shlomo Goldman, an accomplished Torah scholar even in his youth, who is the son of the previous Zhviller Rebbe in Israel.

Other prominent figures in Sanz-Klausenburg are:
 Rabbi Fishel Hershkowitz, the Holeiner Rov, is the Sanz-Klausenburger Dayan in Williamsburg
 Rabbi Aaron Weider, the Linzer Rav (d. 2010), was a long-standing dayan of the Sanz-Klausenburger rabbinical court in America. His daughter Tzipora married Grand Rabbi Shmuel Dovid Halberstam
 Rabbi Paskez, a long-time Rebbi in Yeshiva Torah Vodaas who was the Segan (assistant) of Rabbi Aaron Wieder, is the current Dayan in Boro Park.
 Rabbi Eliyahu Shmuel Schmerler', rosh yeshiva of the Sanz yeshiva in Kiryat Sanz, Netanya

References

External links
The website for Sanz Klausenburg Chasidim
performing a Mitzvah Tantz, a ritual dance (Windows Media Audio/Video file)
The Klausenburger Rebbe of America and his Hasidim celebrating the holiday of Purim (Windows Media Audio/Video file)
Klausenburg of E. Israel website
A collection of videos on 'Tzofar Mashtap' website from the Rebbes of Sanz-Klausenburg Hebrew''

Cluj-Napoca
Sanz (Hasidic dynasty)
Hasidic Judaism in Romania